The WCWA Brass Knuckles Championship was a professional wrestling championship sanctioned by the National Wrestling Alliance and promoted primarily in the Texas territory. Initially the championship saw wrestlers literally using brass knuckles during matches, but was later modified to simply be "No Disqualification" matches. The brass knuckles championship was promoted from 1953 through 1987, and was defended primarily in the Dallas–Fort Worth area as part of Southwest Sports, Inc. It continued to be used after the promotion changed its name to Big Time Wrestling and, finally, World Class Championship Wrestling. In 1987, a year after WCCW left the NWA and became the World Class Wrestling Association, the title was abandoned. As it is a professional wrestling championship, it is won not by actual competition, but by a scripted ending to a match.

The NWA Texas Brass Knuckles Championship was created in 1953 in the Houston, Texas National Wrestling Alliance (NWA) territory Southwest Sports, promoted by Ed McLemore. The first champion was "Wild" Bull Curry, who defeated Danny McShain in the finals of a tournament. The "Brass Knuckles" title was originally created for Curry, who used a very hard hitting, brawling hardcore style of wrestling, with a "no disqualification" stipulation for all championship matches. Over the years Bull Curry would win the championship a record setting 24 times, with Mark Lewin and Bruiser Brody tied for second most reigns at eight total. Due to a lack of documentation, especially from the 1950s to the 1970s, it is possible that Curry won the championship more than 24 times.

In 1966, Fritz Von Erich bought Southwest Sports from McLemore, and continued to promote the brass knuckle championship in the renamed "Big Time Wrestling" promotion. In 1982 Big Time Wrestling was rebranded as "World Class Championship Wrestling", including all the championships dropping the "NWA" prefix for "WCCW". In 1986 WCCW left the NWA completely and was renamed "World Class Wrestling Association" WCWA and renamed all championships as well. Abdullah the Butcher was the last wrestler to win the championship in Texas, defeating The Great Kabuki on July 4, 1986. The championship was not promoted again until WCWA announced that Tony Atlas had won the championship at a non-WCWA show in Montreal, Canada. No record exists of Montreal show, leading to the possibility that the Atlas title victory was fictitious and used to explain why the championship was no longer used. Over the years the championship has been vacated several times, often with a tournament held to determine the next champion, only details of the 1968 tournament, won by Kurt Von Hess, and the 1969 tournament, won by Baron Von Raschke have been found.

Title history

Championship tournaments

NWA Brass Knuckles Championship Tournament (1968)
The NWA Brass Knuckles Championship Tournament was a one-night single elimination tournament held on August 6, 1968, for the vacant NWA Brass Knuckles Championship.

NWA Brass Knuckles Championship Tournament (1969)
The NWA Brass Knuckles Championship Tournament was a one-night single elimination tournament held in Dallas, Texas on June 3, 1969, for the vacant NWA Brass Knuckles Championship.

See also
List of National Wrestling Alliance championships

Footnotes

References

National Wrestling Alliance championships
World Class Championship Wrestling championships
Hardcore wrestling championships
Regional professional wrestling championships
Professional wrestling in Texas